Karczów  (German Schönwitz) is a village in the administrative district of Gmina Dąbrowa in Opole County, Opole Voivodeship in southwestern Poland.

References

Villages in Opole County